Emamzadeh Mohammad (also Romanized as Emāmzādeh Moḩammad) is a village in Rudbar-e Shahrestan Rural District, Alamut-e Gharbi District, Qazvin County, Qazvin Province, Iran. At the 2006 census, its population was 105, in 29 families.

References 

Populated places in Qazvin County